Chhatrasal Bundela (4 May 1649 – 20 December 1731) was an Indian warrior and ruler from the Bundela Rajput clan, who fought against the Mughal Empire, and established his own kingdom in Bundelkhand during the 17th-18th centuries.

Early life 

Chhatrasal was born at Kachar Kachnai in Tikamgarh, on 4 May 1649, to Champat Rai and Sarandha. He was a descendant of Rudra Pratap Singh of Orchha.

Power Struggle against the Mughals 
Chhatrasal was 12 when his father Champat Rai of Mahoba was killed by the Mughals during the reign of Aurangzeb. Inspired by Chhatrapati Shivaji's ideals he travelled to Maharashtra and sought guidance from him. Chhatrasal raised the banner of revolt against the Mughals in Bundelkhand at the age of 22, with an army of 5 horsemen and 25 swordsmen, in 1671.

Chhatrasal declared independence from Mughals in the 1720s and was able to resist the Mughals until he was attacked by Muhammad Khan Bangash in December 1728. Chhatrasal was 79 years old when he led his army against Bangash, after a severe battle Chhatrasal was defeated and was forced to retreat to his fort at Jaitpur. The Mughals besieged him and conquered most of his territories. Chhatrasal made several attempts to ask the Baji Rao I, the Peshwa of Maratha Empire, for help. However, the Peshwa was busy and could not help Chhatrasal until March 1729. In a letter sent to Baji rao, Chhatrasal wrote: "Know you Bajirao! That I am in the same plight in which the famous elephant was when caught by the crocodile. My valiant race is on the point of extinction. Come and save my honour". Peshwa Baji rao I personally led his army towards Bundelkhand and attacked several Mughal outposts, the Mughal supplies were completely cut off by the swift cavalry of the Peshwa in the Battle of Malwa. Bangash, who was surprised by the sudden involvement of the Marathas, sent several letters to the Mughal emperor for aid, however upon being denied any help he started negotiations with Chhatrasal and Bajirao. Bangash was allowed to retreat on the condition that he never returns or shows aggression towards Bundelkhand. Chhatrasal rewarded the peshwa with large tracts of lands and diamond mines in Bundelkhand which helped the Marathas to gain access to Central and North India.

Relations with Bajirao I 

Peshwa Baji Rao's second wife Mastani was Chhatrasal's daughter born from his concubine Ruhani Begum.

Patron of literature 

Chhatrasal was a patron of literature, and his court housed several noted poets. His eulogies written by Kavi Bhushan, Lal Kavi, Bakhshi Hansaraj and other court poets helped him gain lasting fame. 
He also contributed in construction of temples of Kundalpur, a jain pilgrim centre in Madhya Pradesh.

Legacy

The Chhatarpur town and its eponymous district in Madhya Pradesh are named after Chhatrasal. Several places in Chhatarpur, including the Maharaja Chhatrasal Museum, Maharaja Chhatrasal Station Chhatarpur railway station (a railway station in Chhatarpur), are named after him. The Chhatrasal Stadium in Delhi is also named after the Maharaja Chhatrasal.

In popular culture
Veer Chhatrasal is a 1971 Indian historical film about the king by Harsukh Jagneshwar Bhatt, starring Ajit in the titular role. 
Chhatrasal, a 2021 web series released on MX Player starring Jitin Gulati in the titular role of Maharaja Chhatrasal.

References

Further reading 
 Bhagavānadāsa Gupta, Life and times of Maharaja Chhatrasal Bundela, New Delhi, Radiant  (1980).  
 Bhagavānadāsa Gupta, Contemporary Sources of the Mediaeval and Modern History of Bundelkhand (1531-1857), vol. 1 (1999). .
 "Mastani" by D. G. Godse
 Dharmika Teja, a Kannada language historical novel; the story revolves around Maharaja Chhatrasal's youth

External links

History of Uttar Pradesh
1649 births
1731 deaths
Maharajas of Madhya Pradesh
Rajput rulers
Indian warriors